Tonn may refer to:

People
 Adolf Tonn (born 1929), Austrian bobsledder
 Jörg-Christian Tonn (born 1958), German neurosurgeon
 Claudia Tonn (born 1981), German heptathlete
 Jessica Tonn (born 1992), U.S. runner
 Heinz Tonn (1921–2003), Australian rules footballer

Other uses
 Tõnn, an Estonian given name, a variant of Tõnu
 Tonn, a fictional character from the Thai horror film Shutter (2004 film)
 RV Tonn (2015 ship), a Tonn-class survey vessel, see List of Irish state vessels
 Tonn-class ship, see List of Irish state vessels

See also
 Ton (disambiguation)
 Tonne (disambiguation)
 Tonny (disambiguation)